

The Caspar C 30, aka Caspar LE 30 was an aerial reconnaissance aircraft developed in Germany and built in Denmark in the late 1920s.

Design and development
It was a single-bay biplane with staggered, equal-span wings.

Specifications

References

Further reading
 

1920s German military reconnaissance aircraft
C030
Biplanes
Single-engined tractor aircraft
Aircraft first flown in 1926